Bram Fischer International Airport  is a primary airport located in Bloemfontein, the capital city of the Free State province of South Africa. The runways are shared with AFB Bloemspruit.

In November 2012, the South African government announced that the airport's name was to be changed to Bram Fischer International Airport; the official renaming was performed by Pres. Jacob Zuma on Thursday, 13 December 2012.

Facilities
The main terminal building is used for both international and domestic flights. In 2017, the airport served 402,452 passengers. Bloemfontein airport, like many others in South Africa, underwent R46 million's worth of construction and upgrading of the whole airport in preparation for the 2010 FIFA World Cup.

Airlines and destinations

Traffic statistics

See also

 List of airports in South Africa
 List of South African airports by passenger movements

References

External links

 Bloemfontein Airport information - Plane spotting, road transport, airlines...
 
 

Transport in the Free State (province)
Airports in South Africa
Buildings and structures in the Free State (province)
Bloemfontein